Born Free is an American adventure/drama series based on the 1966 movie of the same name. It aired on the NBC television network from September 9 to December 30, 1974, produced by Columbia Pictures Television and starring and narrated by Diana Muldaur.

Synopsis
Gary Collins stars as George Adamson and Diana Muldaur portrays Joy Adamson. The couple live in Kenya with their adopted lioness Elsa, where they protect the animals in the surrounding area from all sorts of danger, both natural and human.

An unrelated television movie called Born Free: A New Adventure was broadcast by ABC in 1996, starring Linda Purl and Chris Noth. Joy and George Adamson do not appear as the main characters in the story.

Cast

Main
 Gary Collins as George Adamson
 Diana Muldaur as Joy Adamson
 Hal Frederick as Makedde
 Dawn Lyn as Reagan
 Peter Lukoye as Nuru

Guest stars
Guest stars included Peter Lawford, Barbara Parkins, Alex Cord, Susan Dey.  Juliet Mills had a recurring role as Dr. Claire Hanley.

Production
The series was set in Kenya and filmed in East Africa.

Reception and cancellation
Born Free was scheduled opposite ABC's Top 20 hit The Rookies and CBS's Top 30 hit Gunsmoke. Rating for the series were low and it was canceled in the middle of the 1974–75 television season after thirteen episodes.

Episodes

DVD release
The complete series Born Free was released in DVD format on August 7, 2012, by Sony Pictures Home Entertainment via its "manufacture on demand" program. It was later re-released by Mill Creek on September 25, 2018.

References

External links

See Also That Series At rapidTV
George Adamson information website with photos, letters and much information and featuring Elsa the Lioness.

1974 American television series debuts
1974 American television series endings
1970s American drama television series
English-language television shows
NBC original programming
Live action television shows based on films
Television series by Sony Pictures Television
Television shows set in Kenya